Lifted is the second studio album by Australian R&B and pop group CDB. The album was released in November 1997 and debuted and peaked at No. 45 on the Australia charts.

Track listing
"Good Times" 
"Down For Love" 
"So Badd" 
"Back Then" 
"Hypnotic" 
"Let It Whip" 
"Never Thought" 
"Lay My Love On You" 
"Lifted" 
"Lessons" 
"Last Dance"
"After The Love Is Gone"
"Live For Love"

Charts

References

1997 albums
Sony Music Australia albums
CDB (band) albums